Kirkandrews or Kirkanders may refer to:
Kirkandrews, Dumfries and Galloway, hamlet in Dumfries and Galloway, Scotland
Kirkandrews-on-Eden, village and former civil parish in Beaumont civil parish, Carlisle, Cumbria, England
Kirkandrews railway station, a former station
Kirkandrews-on-Esk, civil parish in Carlisle, Cumbria, England